劍道, 剣道 or 剑道 may refer to:
Kendo, Japanese sword art
Kumdo, Korean name of kendo